Eduardo Schwank was the defender of title; however, he chose not to play.
Daniel Köllerer won in the final 6–3, 6–3, against Andreas Vinciguerra.

Seeds

Draw

Final four

Top half

Bottom half

References
Main Draw
Qualifying Draw

Roma Open
2009 Singles